
Year 635 (DCXXXV) was a common year starting on Sunday (link will display the full calendar) of the Julian calendar. The denomination 635 for this year has been used since the early medieval period, when the Anno Domini calendar era became the prevalent method in Europe for naming years.

Events 
 By place 
 Byzantine Empire 
 Emperor Heraclius makes an alliance with Kubrat, ruler (khagan) of Great Bulgaria, to break the power of the Avars on the Balkan Peninsula.

 Europe 
 Judicaël, high king of Domnonée (Brittany), visits King Dagobert I at his palace in Clichy (northwest of Paris), to promise he will remain under Frankish lordship. The Breton king arrives with gifts, but insults Dagobert by refusing to eat at the royal table.

 Britain 
 King Meurig of Glywysing and Gwent invades Ergyng (Archenfield), and reunites the two Welsh kingdoms (approximate date).
 King Gartnait III dies after a 4-year reign, and is succeeded by his brother Bridei II, as ruler of the Picts.

 Arabia 
 January – Battle of Fahl: The Rashidun army, (30,000 men) under Khalid ibn al-Walid (known as the "Drawn Sword of God"), defeats the Byzantine forces led by Theodore Trithyrius, at Pella in the Jordan Valley (Jordan).
 Gaza is conquered by the Muslim Arabs under 'Amr ibn al-'As. It becomes the first city in Palestine developed into a centre of Islamic law. 
 By topic  
 Literature 
 Yao Silian, Chinese historian, completes his Book of Liang. It contains the history of the Liang Dynasty.

 Religion 
 Christian missionaries arrive in China: Alopen, bishop of the Assyrian Church of the East, preaches Nestorian Christianity to the Tang Dynasty. 
 Aidan of Lindisfarne, Irish missionary, founds the monastery of Lindisfarne in Northumbria (Northern England).
 Birinus, Frankish missionary, converts King Cynegils of Wessex and becomes the first Bishop of Dorchester.

Births 
 Benedict II, pope of the Catholic Church (d. 685)
 John V, pope of the Catholic Church (d. 686) 
 K'inich Kan B'alam II, ruler of Palenque (d. 702)
 Pepin of Herstal, Mayor of the Palace (approximate date)
 Yijing, Chinese Buddhist monk and traveler (d. 713)

Deaths 
 June 25 – Gao zu, emperor of the Tang Dynasty (b. 566)
 Chen Shuda, prince and chancellor of the Tang Dynasty
 Gartnait III, king of the Picts
 Wu Shihuo, father of Wu Zetian (b. 559)

References